Dacryodes elmeri is a tree in the family Burseraceae. It is named for the American botanist Adolph Elmer.

Description

Distribution and habitat
Dacryodes elmeri is endemic to Borneo and is very uncommon. Its habitat is lowland forests.

References

elmeri
Endemic flora of Borneo
Trees of Borneo
Plants described in 1932
Flora of the Borneo lowland rain forests